The N78 road is a national secondary road in Ireland. The  road links the N77 national secondary road north of Kilkenny, County Kilkenny to the M9 national primary route at Mullamast in County Kildare. En route it passes through the towns of Castlecomer in County Kilkenny, Ballylynan in County Laois, and Athy in County Kildare. It is single carriageway throughout.

Before the opening of the M9 motorway from Kilcullen to Carlow in 2009, the N78 ran from Athy to Kilcullen instead of Mullamast but the Athy-Kilcullen section was reclassified as part of the R418 regional road and a new greenfield section of N78 was constructed to join Athy to the M9. 

The now R418 section once formed an integral part of the T6 - the old trunk road that connected the cities of Cork and Dublin before the contemporary numbering system was established.

See also
Roads in Ireland 
Motorways in Ireland
National primary road
Regional road

References
Roads Act 1993 (Classification of National Roads) Order 2006 – Department of Transport

National secondary roads in the Republic of Ireland
Roads in County Kilkenny
Roads in County Laois
Roads in County Kildare